The Israeli Basketball Super League (BSL) 2008-2009 season was the 55th season of the top basketball league in Israel. The season began on 26 October 2008 and ended on 21 May 2009. Maccabi Tel Aviv won its 48th league title, defeating Maccabi Haifa Heat 85-72 in the final. The defending champion was Hapoel Holon.

Each out of the 12 participating teams played 22 regular league games, one home game and one away game against each other team. The top eight teams qualified to the playoff, where they played best-of-5 series decided by the rankings at the end of the regular season (first against eighth, second against seventh and so on).

The four last ranked team competed in a best-of-5 series relegation playoff, where
Elitzur Kiryat Ata and Maccabi Giv'at Shmuel lost and were relegated to Liga Leumit. They will be replaced by Maccabi Elitzur Netanya and Hapoel Afula, who qualified from Liga Leumit.

Regular season

Pld - Played; W - Won; L - Lost; PF - Points for; PA - Points against; Diff - Difference; Pts - Points.

Playoff

The higher ranked team hosts games 1, 3 and 5 (if necessary). The lower ranked team hosts games 2 and 4 (if necessary).

Final four

Relegation playoff

The higher ranked team hosts games 1, 3 and 5 (if necessary). The lower ranked team hosts games 2 and 4 (if necessary).

Elitzur Kiryat Ata and Maccabi Giv'at Shmuel were relegated to Liga Leumit.

Awards

The 2008–2009 Basketball Super League Season Awards were granted during the Israeli Basketball Super League Administration Gala Dinner on May 16 to the players who stood out the most during the regular season and the playoff. The MVP awards for the best player and coach of the season were given before the final game had been played.

BSL 2008–2009 MVP

 Doron Perkins (Maccabi Haifa Heat)

BSL 2008–2009 Final MVP

 Carlos Arroyo (Maccabi Tel Aviv)

Coach of the season

 Avi Ashkenazi (Maccabi Haifa Heat)

All-BSL Team

 Doron Perkins (Maccabi Haifa Heat)
 Luis Flores (Hapoel Holon)
 Omri Casspi (Maccabi Tel Aviv)
 Lior Eliyahu (Maccabi Tel Aviv)
 Omar Sneed (Hapoel Jerusalem)

Best 6th man

 Davon Jefferson (Maccabi Haifa Heat)

Best newcomer

 Gal Mekel (Gilboa/Galil)

Most improving player

 Uri Kukia (Hapoel Holon)

Best defensive player

 Brian Randle (Gilboa/Galil)

See also
Israeli Basketball State Cup 2008-09

References

IBA's official website (Hebrew)
BSL (English)

Israeli Basketball Premier League seasons
Israeli
League